Brian James Stacey, (3 December 194625 October 1996) was an Australian conductor who started his career with the Queensland Ballet, the Australian Ballet, and Victoria State Opera, latterly becoming known for his work in Australian musical theatre (particularly with the Australian production of The Phantom of the Opera) but continuing his cross-genre career to the end of his life.

Biography 

Brian Stacey was born in Sydney, Australia. He entered the New South Wales Conservatorium of Music in 1964, graduating with a Bachelor of Music in 1967. In 1968 he married Monica Cunningham and had two daughters, Melinda Ann (1972) and Nicole Maree (1974). He was employed as director of music, Southern Cross University (formerly Northern Rivers College of Advanced Education, Lismore). He then studied for a master's degree in Music at the Queensland Conservatorium, studying with Australian composer Colin Brumby. In 1986 he began his relationship with Kathryn Sadler, with whom he would remain until his death.

His career highlights included: music director of the Australian Ballet, resident conductor for the Victoria State Opera, guest conductor with The Australian Opera, and regular appearances with the opera companies of South Australia, West Australia, and Auckland (New Zealand). Stacey was a protégé of the Australian conductor Sir Charles Mackerras, studying with and assisting him in the early 1980s, and in 1995 assisting him again on a production of Janáček's Káťa Kabanová with Opera Australia.

Career 

 1975 Music director for Queensland Ballet, Queensland Theatre Company and Queensland Light Opera.
 1980 Travelled to the United Kingdom to study with, and assist Sir Charles Mackerras
 1983 On his return to Australia Stacey was employed as music director by The Australian Ballet.
 1985 Appointed as resident conductor and head of music staff at Victoria State Opera
 1986 Consultant to the Crown Prince of Tonga for the development of music in the Kingdom of Tonga
 Guest conductor, Mercury Theatre Opera Group, Auckland, New Zealand
 1987 Guest conductor, State Opera of South Australia and The Australian Opera
 1988 Guest conductor, Adelaide Symphony Orchestra
 1989 Guest conductor, Queensland Symphony Orchestra, Melbourne Spoleto Festival
 1990 Music director, Marina Prior's album Leading Lady and Anthony Warlow's album Centrestage
 1990 Musical Director, The Phantom of the Opera , Original Australian production, Melbourne.
 1992 Records An Evening of Classics with the State Orchestra of Victoria
 Music director, Marina Prior's album Aspects of Andrew Lloyd Webber
 Music director, Anthony Warlow's album On the Boards
 1993 Music director, Into the Woods for Sydney Theatre Company
 Conducts Bizet's Carmen for Auckland Opera
 Music director, Follies in concert
 Guest conductor, My Fair Lady for Victoria State Opera
 1994 conducts West Side Story for IMG / Victoria State Opera
 Conducts Kismet for Victoria State Opera
 Conducts A Dinner Engagement for Port Fairy Folk Festival, Victoria, Australia
 1995 Assisting Sir Charles Mackerras on a production of Janáček's Káťa Kabanová with Opera Australia
 Conducts Candide for the Brisbane Biennial
 Conducts Ruddigore for Victoria State Opera
 Music director for The Secret Garden
 1996 records CD Morning Melodies Volume 2 with State Orchestra of Victoria
 Conducts Die Fledermaus for West Australian Opera
 Conducts Aida for Victoria State Opera, music director of Sweeney Todd for Queensland Theatre Company, conducts concert of music by Kurt Weill for Melbourne Symphony, music director of Sunset Boulevard. Stacey died the day before the opening night of Sunset Boulevard

Awards 

Awarded The Age Performing Arts Award for Best Musical Director 1995

Death 

Brian Stacey died in Carlton, Melbourne, on 25 October 1996, the night before the premiere of Sunset Boulevard, due to a motorcycle accident. Stacey was survived by his partner Kathryn Sadler, and his daughters, Melinda and Nicole.

Andrew Lloyd Webber described Stacey's death as "a loss to the world of music theatre, not just Australia".

Stacey's ashes are spread on the banks of the Yarra River, Melbourne, Victoria. Seat S10 in the State Theatre, Arts Centre Melbourne, was dedicated to Brian's memory in 2008. A tribute film was made to celebrate his life and to mark the winding up of the Brian Stacey Memorial Trust in 2016. The film includes interviews with Sir Charles Mackerras, Guy Noble, Suzanne Johnston, Hugh Jackman, Marina Prior, Rhonda Burchmore, Sue Natrass and other Australian musicians.

Brian Stacey Memorial Trust Award for emerging Australian conductors 
The Brian Stacey Memorial Trust was launched at the Princess Theatre, Melbourne, in 1997 (on the first anniversary of his death). The Brian Stacey Memorial Trust Fund serves to commemorate Stacey's life and work and his contribution to musical life.

Patrons
Sir Cameron Mackintosh
Sir Charles Mackerras (until his death in 2010)

Trustees
Kathryn Sadler (Chairman)
Andrew Jenkins
Melinda Stacey
Sue Nattrass
Stanton Sharman

Past trustee
Stephen Dee (original Chair)
Mietta O'Donnell (until her death in 2001)

Director
Andrea Gaze

The Fund's purpose was to provide support to emerging conductors in Australia who wished to enhance their conducting skills, in particular by exploring performance genres outside their normal field of work. The final award of $10,000 from the Trust was awarded to Toby Thatcher to enable him to continue further study of the conducting profession and an opportunity to broaden his repertoire knowledge.

1998 Guy Noble
1999 Kynan Johns
2000 Max Xinyu-Liu
2001 Matthew Coorey
2002 Kellie Dickerson
2003 Benjamin Northey
2004 Simon Hewett
2005 Mark Shiell
2006 Ollivier Cuneo
2007 Dane Lam
2008 Paul Fitzsimon
2008 Vanessa Scammell
2009 Daniel Smith
2010 Burhan Güner
2011 Trevor Jones and James Pratt
2012 Daniel Carter
2013 Carolyn Watson
2014 Russell Ger
2015 Jessica Gethin
2016 Toby Thatcher

Brian Stacey Memorial Trust Professional Development Awards for an emerging Australian conductor 2018 

In August 2018 the Brian Stacey Trust announced the 2018 Brian Stacey Professional Development Awards

Christopher Dragon ($5,000)
Natalia Raspopova ($2,500).

References

External links 

 The Brian Stacey Memorial Trust website
 Summary of Stacey's career, AusStage.edu.au

1946 births
1996 deaths
Australian conductors (music)
Sydney Conservatorium of Music alumni
Queensland Conservatorium Griffith University alumni
20th-century Australian musicians
Musicians from Sydney
20th-century conductors (music)